Shannon McCurley (born 26 April 1992) is an Australian-born Irish female track cyclist, who became the first Irish female to qualify for an Olympic track cycling event.

Background
McCurley was born in Melbourne.  Her father was from Belfast, and her mother from Dublin, so she had the potential to participate in sport for three countries, United Kingdom, Republic of Ireland and Australia.  She first visited Ireland in 2012.

Career
McCurley began her sports career with running but switched to cycling after some injuries and a brief try at triathlon.

McCurley trains primarily in Melbourne, where she's based. She also trains with the Irish track cycling team in Majorca. Her coach is John Beasley.

She won the bronze medal in the under-23 scratch event at the 2011 European Track Championships (under-23 & junior). She competed in the scratch event at the 2012 UCI Track Cycling World Championships.

After some injuries, McCurley switched her focus to keirin racing in 2014 to avoid quick-start sprints and to attempt to qualify for the 2016 Summer Olympics in Rio de Janeiro. She was successful and, thus, became the first Irish female to qualify for an Olympic track cycling event.

Career results
2011
3rd Scratch Race, UEC European U23 Track Championships
2014
Irish International Track GP
1st Scratch Race
2nd Keirin
3rd Scratch Race, BikeNZ Cup
2015
South East Asian GP Track
2nd Keirin
2nd Keirin
3rd Sprint

References

External links
 
 
 
 
 
 
 

1992 births
Living people
Irish track cyclists
Irish female cyclists
Olympic cyclists of Ireland
Cyclists at the 2016 Summer Olympics
Cyclists at the 2020 Summer Olympics
European Games competitors for Ireland
Cyclists at the 2019 European Games